The Pakistan national cricket team or Pak cricket team, often referred to as the Shaheens, Green Shirts, Men in Green and Cornered Tigers is administered by the Pakistan Cricket Board (PCB). The team is a Full Member of the International Cricket Council, and participates in Test, One Day International (ODI) and Twenty20 International cricket matches.

Pakistan has played 451 Test matches, winning 146, losing 139 and drawing 166. Pakistan was given Test status on 28 July 1952 and made its Test debut against India at Feroz Shah Kotla Ground, Delhi in October 1952, with India winning by an innings and 70 runs.

The team has played 948 ODIs, winning 499, losing 420, tying 9 with 20 ending in no-result. Pakistan was the 1992 World Cup champion, and was the runner-up in the 1999 tournament. Pakistan, in conjunction with other countries in South Asia, has hosted the 1987 and 1996 World Cups, with the 1996 final being hosted at Gaddafi Stadium in Lahore.

The team has also played 215 Twenty20 Internationals, winning 131, losing 76 and tying 3. Pakistan won the 2009 ICC Men's T20 World Cup and were runners-up in the 2007 and 2022 editions.

Pakistan has the distinct achievement of having won each of the major ICC international cricket tournaments: ICC Cricket World Cup (1992), ICC T20 World Cup (2009) and ICC Champions Trophy (2017); as well as becoming the fourth team to lift the mace of the ICC Test Championship in 2016.

The increase in terrorism as a result of the war on terror led to a stagnation of foreign teams touring Pakistan. Following the 2009 attack on the Sri Lanka national cricket team, no Test cricket was played in the country until 2019. Between 2009 and 2016, their home matches have been mostly held in the United Arab Emirates. However, due to a decrease in terrorism in Pakistan over the past few years, as well as an increase in security, many teams have toured Pakistan since 2015. These teams include Zimbabwe, Sri Lanka, West Indies, Bangladesh, South Africa, Australia, England, New Zealand and an ICC World XI team. In addition, the Pakistan Super League has seen games hosted in Pakistan.

History

Cricket in Pakistan has a history predating the creation of the country in 1947. The first ever international cricket match in Karachi was held on 22 November 1935 between Sindh and Australian cricket teams. The match was seen by 5,000 Karachiites. Ghulam Mohammad was the captain of team Sind and Frank Tarrant was the captain of Tarrant's team. Following the independence of Pakistan in 1947, cricket in the country developed rapidly and Pakistan was given Test match status at a meeting of the Imperial Cricket Conference at Lord's in England on 28 July 1952 following recommendation by India, which, being the successor state of the British Raj, did not have to go through such a process. The first captain of the Pakistan national cricket team was Abdul Hafeez Kardar.

Pakistan's first Test match was played in Delhi in October 1952 as part of a five Test series which India won 2–1. Pakistan made their first tour of England in 1954 and drew the series 1–1 after a victory at The Oval in which fast bowler Fazal Mahmood took 12 wickets. Pakistan's first home Test match was against India in January 1955 at Bangabandhu National Stadium, Dacca, East Pakistan (now Bangladesh), after which four more Test matches were played in Bahawalpur, Lahore, Peshawar and Karachi (all five matches in the series were drawn, the first such occurrence in Test history).

The team is considered a strong but unpredictable team. Traditionally Pakistani cricket has been composed of talented players but is alleged to display limited discipline on occasion, making their performance inconsistent at times. In particular, the India-Pakistan cricket rivalry is usually emotionally charged and can provide for intriguing contests, as talented teams and players from both sides of the border seek to elevate their game to new levels. Pakistan team contests with India in the Cricket World Cup have resulted in packed stadiums and highly charged atmospheres. The team is well supported at home and abroad, especially in the United Kingdom where British Pakistanis have formed a fan-club called the "Stani Army". Members of the club show up to matches across the country and are known to provide raucous support. The Stani Army also takes part in charity initiatives for underprivileged Pakistanis, including annual friendly cricket matches against British Indian members of the similar "Bharat Army".

1986 Austral-Asia Cup (Champions)

The 1986 Austral-Asia Cup, played in Sharjah in UAE, saw a last-ball victory for Pakistan against their arch-rivals India, with Javed Miandad emerging as a national hero. India batted first and set a target of 245 runs, leaving Pakistan with a required run rate of 4.92 runs per over. Miandad came in to bat at number 3 and Pakistan lost wickets at regular intervals. Later recalling the match, he stated that his main focus was to lose with dignity. With 31 runs needed in the last three overs, Miandad hit a string of boundaries while batting with his team's lower order, until four runs were required from the last delivery of the match. Miandad received a leg side full toss from Chetan Sharma, which he hit for six over the midwicket boundary.

1992 Cricket World Cup (Champions)

At the 1992 World Cup Semi-final, having won the toss, New Zealand chose to bat first and ended with a total of 262 runs. Pakistan batted conservatively yet lost wickets at regular intervals. With the departure of Imran Khan and Saleem Malik shortly thereafter, Pakistan still required 115 runs at a rate of 7.67 runs per over with veteran Javed Miandad being the only known batsman remaining at the crease. A young Inzamam-ul-Haq, who had just turned 22 and was not a well-known player at the time, burst onto the international stage with a match-winning 60 off 37 balls. Once Inzamam got out, Pakistan required 36 runs from 30 balls, which wicket-keeper Moin Khan ended with a towering six over long off, followed by the winning boundary to midwicket. The match is seen as the emergence of Inzamam onto the international stage.

The 1992 Cricket World Cup in Australia and New Zealand marked Pakistan's first World Cup victory. It is remembered for the comeback Pakistan made after losing key players such as Waqar Younis and Saeed Anwar and being led by an injured captain Imran Khan. Pakistan lost 3 of their first 5 matches and were nearly eliminated in the first round of the tournament after being bowled out for 74 runs against England, until the match was declared as a "no result" due to rain. Imran Khan told the team to play like "cornered tigers", after which Pakistan won five successive matches, including the semi-final against hosts New Zealand and the final against England.

2007 Cricket World Cup
The 2007 Cricket World Cup was one of the biggest upsets in World Cup history when Pakistan was knocked out of the competition in a shock defeat to Ireland, who were playing in their first competition. Pakistan, needing to win to qualify for the next stage after losing to the West Indies in their opening match, were put into bat by Ireland. They lost wickets regularly and only 4 batsmen scored double figures. In the end they were bowled out by the Irish for 132 runs. The Irish went on to win the match, after Niall O'Brien scored 72 runs. This meant that Pakistan had been knocked out during the first round for the second consecutive World Cup. Tragedy struck the team when coach Bob Woolmer died one day later on 18 March 2007 in a hospital in Kingston, Jamaica. Jamaican police spokesman Karl Angell reported on 23 March 2007 that, "Mr Woolmer's death was due to asphyxiation as a result of manual strangulation" and that, "Mr Woolmer's death is now being treated by the Jamaica police as a case of murder." Assistant coach Mushtaq Ahmed acted as temporary coach for the team's final group game of the tournament. Subsequent to his team's defeat and the death of Woolmer, Inzamam-ul-Haq announced his resignation as captain of the team and his retirement from one-day cricket, stating that he would continue to take part in Test cricket but not as captain. Shoaib Malik was announced as his successor. Following his return to the squad, Salman Butt was appointed as vice-captain until December 2007.

On 23 March 2007, Pakistan players and officials were questioned by Jamaican police and submitted DNA samples along with fingerprints, as part of the routine enquiries in the investigation into Woolmer's murder. Three days after leaving the West Indies for Pakistan, via London, the Pakistan team were ruled out as suspects. The deputy commissioner of Jamaican police. Mark Shields, the detective in charge of the investigation, announced, "It's fair to say they are now being treated as witnesses." "I have got no evidence to suggest it was anybody in the squad." A memorial service was held in Sacred Heart Church, Lahore, for Bob Woolmer on 1 April 2007. Among the attendees were Pakistan players and dignitaries, including Inzamam-ul-Haq, who was quoted as saying, "After Woolmer's family, the Pakistan team was the most aggrieved by his death." After the World Cup ended, serious doubts were raised about the investigation, with increasing speculation that Woolmer died of natural causes. This has now been accepted as fact, and the case has been closed.

On 20 April 2007, a PCB official announced that former Test cricketer Talat Ali would act as interim coach, in addition to his rôle as team manager, until a new coach had been appointed. On 16 July 2007, Geoff Lawson, previously head coach of New South Wales, was appointed coach of Pakistan for two years, becoming the third foreigner to take on the rôle. In the 2007 ICC World Twenty20, Pakistan exceeded expectations to reach the final but ended as runners-up, after losing the final to India in a nail-biting finish. On 25 October 2008, Intikhab Alam was named as a national coach of the team by the PCB.

2009 ICC World T20 (Champions)
In the final at Lord's, the home of cricket in London, Sri Lanka won the toss and elected to bat. The first over was bowled by Mohammad Amir. After failing to score off the first four balls – all short – Dilshan went for his scoop and mistimed it, resulting in him being caught at short fine-leg. Soon after this, Jehan Mubarak top-edged a delivery by Abdul Razzaq which went high in the air and was caught by Shahzaib Hasan, leaving Sri Lanka at 2 for 2.[13] Sanath Jayasuriya was able to stabilise the innings for Sri Lanka hitting 17 runs off 10 balls, however, Jayasuriya soon fell as he dragged a good length ball back on to the stumps. Mahela Jayawardene followed after edging a shot into the hands of Misbah-ul-Haq, leaving Sri Lanka on 32/4.[14] Sangakkara and Chamara Silva added further runs before the latter was caught by Saeed Ajmal playing a pull shot off the bowling of Umar Gul.[15] Shahid Afridi soon after, took the wicket of Isuru Udana with a googly which drifted into the right-hander, knocking the off-stump. This brought in Angelo Mathews, who along with Sangakkara took the score from 70/6 to 138/6, with 17 runs being scored off the last over bowled by Mohammad Amir. Sri Lanka finished on 138/6 from 20 overs.[16]

Pakistan started off well with openers Kamran Akmal and Shahzaib Hasan adding 48 runs for the 1st wicket before Kamran Akmal was stumped by Kumar Sangakkara by the first delivery of Sanath Jayasuriya.[13] Pakistan reached the target in 18.4 overs, with Shahid Afridi, who hit the winning runs, earning Man of the Match[17] while Tillakaratne Dilshan was declared Man of the Series for his 317 runs at an average of 63.40. Pakistan's win often cheered on by crowds of fans from England's Pakistani communities, marked its first world title since Imran Khan's "cornered tigers" had won the 1992 World Cup."We all know how important this World Cup was with so much happening in Pakistan," Afridi said. "The guys motivated themselves for this World Cup."

Afridi had a quiet start to the tournament with the bat but responded strongly with match-winning half-centuries in the semi-final and final. He also took 11 wickets in the tournament.

He said the support staff, including the head coach Intikhab Alam and bowling coach Aaqib Javed, played a role in shaping the team's victory.

"They all really worked hard with the guys and kept them united and close to each other, that's why we had success," Afridi said.  Shahid Afridi was the man who won the heart of people of Pakistan

2010 ICC World T20 (Semi-finalists)
The 2010 World T20 was held in West Indies, where Pakistan was able to reach for the semi-final stage. Pakistan, Australia and Bangladesh were in Group A. Pakistan won the first match against Bangladesh by 21 runs. Salman Butt became the hero of the match with his 73 runs from just 46 balls. The second match for Pakistan was with Australia, where Australia won the toss and elected to bat. They scored 191/10 with 49 ball 81 runs by Shane Watson. In this match, final over of Australian innings was bowled by Mohammad Amir. He took a triple-wicket maiden and there were two run-outs, and eventually five wickets fell in the final over of Australia's innings.

In Super 8s stage, Pakistan lost to England, and New Zealand, only won against South Africa. They finished only behind England in Group E of Super 8s, reached to the semi-finals The semi-final for Pakistan was again with Australia, where they scored 191/6 with Umar Akmal's not out 56 runs. Australia had a good start, where Michael Hussey scored a match winning unbeaten 64 runs from just 24 balls. Australia scored 197/7 in 19.5 overs and won the match. With this match, Pakistan lost their defended World T20 title.

2011 Cricket World Cup (Semi-finalists) 

Pakistan started well in the ICC Cricket World Cup, which was held in India, Sri Lanka and Bangladesh, after beating Kenya, Sri Lanka (one of the tournament favourites) and bye a margin, beating Canada. Shahid Afridi clearly stated that his team is capable of qualifying for the Semifinals. After a huge loss against New Zealand, Pakistan defeated Zimbabwe by 7 wickets. After victory against Zimbabwe Pakistan cemented their shot at playing the ICC CWC 2011 Quarters. One of the highlights of the tournament for Pakistan was when they beat Australia, who were led by 3 brilliant pace bowlers, Brett Lee, Shaun Tait and Mitchell Johnson. However Pakistan defied the odds and defeated Australia, courtesy of a brilliant bowling display. This saw Australia's record win streak of 27 consecutive world cup games broken which saw them win every game between the 1999 world cup up until this game. In the quarter-finals they played West Indies. Pakistan were ruthless, as they emphatically won against the West Indies side by 10 wickets, due to another brilliant bowling display. In the semi-finals on 30 March, Pakistan had a match with its fiercest rival, India. India managed 260 after they batted first. Not having a good batting line-up along with a slow start to the chase, Pakistan were 29 runs short as India reached the final (India went on to win the final, by defeating Sri Lanka).

2012 ICC World T20 (Semi-finalists) 
The 2012 edition of World T20 was held in Sri Lanka, where Pakistan grouped in Group D with New Zealand, and Bangladesh. They won comfortably against the two teams, and stood up as top of group D. In super eight contest, Pakistan first played against South Africa, where Pakistan won the match by just 2 wickets. next match was against India, which always given a much publicity by all over the fans. Pakistan bowled out for just 128 runs, where India reached the target with only 2 wickets given. Pakistan won their last Super eight match against Australia by 32 runs, where Saeed Ajmal performed well in the match by taking 3 wickets for 17 runs. Pakistan qualified for the semi-finals after superior net run rate than India.

The Pakistan semi-final was with the host-Sri Lanka. Sri Lanka scored 139/ with Mahela Jayawardena took the gear. Pakistan nearly chased the target, but wickets in crucial interval gave them backward. Skipper Mohammad Hafeez scored 42 runs and all the other batsmen not going well. The match was turned towards Sri Lanka with magical spell by Rangana Herath, who took wickets of Mohammad Hafeez, Shahid Afridi and Shoaib Malik. Pakistan lost the match by 16 runs.

2014 ICC World T20 
The 2014 ICC World T20 was held by Bangladesh. The Pakistani team was in Bangladesh prior to the World T20, due to 2014 Asia Cup, which was held by Bangladesh. Pakistan played for the Group 2, with mighty oppositions. The tournament was a disappointing one for the Pakistanis, where they won 2 and lost 2, finished the group as third and disqualified for the semi-finals.

The first group match was with rivals India, which India won by 7 wickets. The next match was against Australia, where Pakistan scored 191/5 with brilliant batting of Umar Akmal. Australia had a fierce going with 33 ball 74 runs by Glenn Maxwell, but only managed to score 175. Pakistan won the match by 16 runs. The match against Bangladesh was a comfortable win by 50 runs. Pakistani opening batsman Ahmed Shehzad scored the maiden T20I century by a Pakistani. He finished with an unbeaten 111 off 62 balls. The crucial match was with West Indies, where the winning team would go through to the semi-final. West Indies won the toss and elected to bat first. They scored 166/6 in their 20 overs, West Indies scored 82 runs off the last 5 overs giving a fearsome hitting to the Pakistani bowlers. Pakistan's chase was unsuccessful as they were bowled out for just 82 runs. Pakistan was eliminated from the tournament with this result.

2015 Cricket World Cup (Quarter-finalists) 
Pakistan started poorly in the 2015 Cricket World Cup. Their first match was against cricket rivals — India. India batted first and scored 300/7 with Virat Kohli scoring a century. After a poor start to the run chase, Pakistan's skipper Misbah-ul-Haq made a useful contribution of 76 runs but Pakistan lost the match by 76 runs. The second match against West Indies was a disaster. West Indies posted 310/6 on the board. In response, Pakistan lost 4 wickets for 1 run on the board, a first in an ODI match. The team was bowled out for 160 and lost the match by 150 runs.

Pakistan then won their next four games against Zimbabwe, UAE, South Africa and Ireland. Sarfaraz Ahmed scored Pakistan's only century against Ireland and was awarded Man of the Match against both South Africa and Ireland. The victory was Pakistan's first against South Africa in a World Cup match. Pakistan finished third in group B and qualified for the quarterfinals.

The quarterfinal match of Pakistan was against Australia. Pakistan scored 213 runs. Australia started steadily but wickets regularly fell during the middle overs. The match gained a lot of attraction due to the on-field rivalry between Australian all-rounder, Shane Watson and Pakistani pacer, Wahab Riaz. Wahab's spell was praised despite not picking up many wickets. Pakistan dropped catches during the first power-play and conceded many runs. The partnership between Steve Smith and Glenn Maxwell allowed Australia to win the match. As a result, Pakistan were knocked out of the tournament. The match was the final ODI for Pakistani's captain Misbah-ul-Haq and experienced all-rounder Shahid Afridi.

After 2015 Cricket World Cup 
After the 2015 Cricket World Cup, Misbah-ul-Haq and Shahid Afridi ended their ODI careers. As a result, the captaincy of the ODI team was given to newcomer Azhar Ali. Under his captaincy, Pakistan played their first ODI series against Bangladesh. The tour was a disappointment and Pakistan lost all three ODIs as well as the T20 match. Clever bowling coupled with wonderful batting and fielding allowed the hosts to stroll past the visitors. This was Bangladesh's first win against Pakistan since the 1999 Cricket World Cup and first ever series win over Pakistan. However, Pakistan ended the tour on a positive with a 1–0 win in the two-match test series.

Pakistan played a home series against Zimbabwe in May 2015 after 6 years. This was the first tour by a Test-playing nation since the attack on the Sri Lankan cricket team in 2009. Pakistan won the T20I series 2–0 and the ODI series 2–0 after the third match ended in a draw due to rain.
During the Sri Lanka tour in 2015, Pakistan won the Test series 2–1, the ODI series 3–2 and the T20I series 2–0. The successful tour allowed Pakistan to qualify for the 2017 ICC Champions Trophy, removing West Indies from a place in the tournament. The series win pushed up Pakistan's ranking in all three formats of the game.

In September, Pakistan travelled to Zimbabwe for 2 T20Is and 3 ODIs. Pakistan won the T20I series 2–0 and the ODI series 2–1. As a result, Pakistan concluded their 2015 season rankings as 4th in Tests, 8th in ODIs, and 2nd in T20Is.

2017 
Misbah-ul-Haq and Younis Khan, who had been the mainstays of the Pakistani batting line-up, announced their retirements from Test cricket (the only format they played at that time) at the completion of the West Indies tour 2017. Pakistan won the T20I series 3–1 and the ODI series 2–1 in the same tour under the captaincy of Sarfaraz Ahmed. In his final Test series, Misbah made history by being the first Pakistani captain to win an away Test series against West Indies in West Indies. Sarfaraz Ahmed was announced as Misbah's successor. In his first series against Sri Lanka, who toured UAE, Pakistan lost both Test matches. It was first time in 10 years that Pakistan lost their home series, the first time they lost was against the Australian team and the first time in the UAE ever since it became Pakistan's adoptive home.

2017 ICC Champions Trophy (Champions) 

The tournament did not start well for Pakistan, losing to their arch-rivals India by 124 runs. But as the group stages progressed the bowling attack improved significantly for Pakistan, winning games against South Africa by 19 runs, and a crucial game against Sri Lanka by 3 wickets. This set up a semi-final against hosts and favourites England, where Hasan Ali took 3 wickets to take Pakistan to their first ICC Champions Trophy Final, a highly anticipated re-match with India.

In the final before a packed house at The Oval, India won the toss and elected to bowl first. Pakistan's batting lineup made India question their decision with opening batsman Fakhar Zaman scoring his maiden One Day International century (114 off 106 deliveries), with major contributions from Azhar Ali (59) and Mohammad Hafeez (57*) pushing Pakistan to a total of 338. India lost their top order quickly with Mohammad Amir getting the key wickets of Rohit Sharma, Shikhar Dhawan and Virat Kohli. Resistance came in the form of Hardik Pandya, who scored a brisk 76. Hasan Ali, Pakistan's star find in this tournament took the final wicket finishing with figures of 3–19, leaving India 180 runs short of the target and handing Pakistan their first Champions Trophy. The margin of victory was the largest in an ICC tournament final.

Hasan Ali was named as player of the tournament. Pakistan captain, Sarfaraz Ahmed stated (after the opening match against India) "I said to the boys, the tournament doesn't finish here. Good cricket, positive cricket and we will win". After Pakistan's victory, they moved up from 8th to 6th in the ICC ODI rankings. The ICC Team of the Tournament had Sarfaraz Ahmed as captain, Fakhar Zaman, Junaid Khan and Hasan Ali from Pakistan.

Test cricket

Pakistan's first Test match was played in Delhi in October 1952 as part of a five Test series. They lost the first test by an innings and 70 runs. India scored 372 runs in their first innings and Pakistan managed 302 runs in combined both innings. However, it just took seven days to turn things around for the Pakistani's. In second Test match, Pakistan blew India away for 106 before Pakistan, with the help of Hanif Mohammad's 124, scored 331 in their first innings, taking a lead of 225. India were bowled out for 182, giving Pakistan a win by an innings and 43 runs. It was Fazal Mahmood's game as he took 12/94. India won the next match by 10 wickets before the final two test were drawn, which resulted India winning series 2–1.

Pakistan made their first tour of England in 1954 and drew the series 1–1 after a victory at The Oval in which fast bowler Fazal Mahmood took 12 wickets. Pakistan's first home Test match was against India in January 1955 at Bangabandhu National Stadium, Dacca, East Pakistan (now Bangladesh), after which four more Test matches were played in Bahawalpur, Lahore, Peshawar and Karachi (all five matches in the series were drawn, the first such occurrence in Test history). In the same year, New Zealand toured Pakistan for their first series against them. They defeated New Zealand by an innings and 1 run in the first test and won the second test match by 4 wickets. The final test ended in a draw, resulting in Pakistan's first ever Test series win, with 2-0 margin.

In 1956 Australia toured Pakistan and played one test, which Pakistan won. They bowled Australia out for 80 in their first innings. Pakistan took a lead of 119 runs when they were dismissed at 199. Pakistan bowled Australia out for 187 in the second innings, giving the hosts a target of 68. Pakistan won comfortably by 9 wickets. Again, Fazal Mahmood was the chief destroyer, taking 13/114 in the match.

Pakistan visited West Indies in 1958 for a five-test series. Pakistan drew the first test. It was Hanif Mohammad's match as he saved Pakistan after they were bowled out for 106 in reply to West Indies' first innings of 579. Trailing by 473, Mohammad played the longest test match innings - a marathon 970 minutes for his match-saving 337. The next three tests went in West Indies' favour before Pakistan won their first match against them by an innings and 1 run. In that match, it was another Mohammad performance. This time it was Hanif's brother Wazir Mohammad who scored 189 out of Pakistan's 496 in reply to the hosts' 268. West Indies were bowled out for 227 in their second innings but the series went to them by 3–1.

Performance in 1970s until 1990s

From 1970 to 1979, Pakistan played over 13 Test series, which they won 3, lost 5 and drew 5. In total of 41 Test matches, Pakistan won 6, lost 12 and drew 23. They had a below par performance. But from 1980 to 1989, they did better. Out of 21 Test series they have played from that period, they won 9, lost 5 and drew 7. In terms of matches, they played total of 72 matches, winning 20 and losing 12 with 40 draws. In 1987, Pakistan went to India for five match series. It was Sunil Gavaskar's last test series. The first four test went draw but the final match was thriller. Pakistan scored 116 before India scored 145. Pakistan came back with 249 on board, giving the host a target of 220. India fell 16 runs short and the series was considered one of the best India-Pakistan series. In 1988, after West Indies tour where they drew 1-1 (3), Pakistan were rated as No.1 Test team. It was one of greatest moments in their history.

From 1990 to 1999, Pakistan did even better. They played 29 series, winning over 15 and losing 9 with 5 drawn. In terms of matches, they played 74, winning 40, losing 21 and drawing 13. In this period, the lowest point of for Pakistan came in 1998 where they lost to Zimbabwe 1–0 in three match series. The biggest moment came in Asian Test Championship in 1998 where they defeated Sri Lanka in the final by an innings and 175 runs.

21st century
In 2002, Pakistan participated in their second Asian Test Championship. It was originally planned to include all four Asian ICC full-members (Bangladesh, India, Pakistan and Sri Lanka). However, before the tournament started, India's participation was put in doubt. After defeating Bangladesh in the 1st Test to meet Sri Lanka in the final, they were defeated by them by 8 wickets.

A major controversy occurred in 2006 when the team toured England for a four-match Test series. England led the series 2-0 going into the final Test. In the first innings of that match, they were bowled out for 173 and Pakistan scored 504 in reply. In the second innings, after the dismissal of Alastair Cook for 83 off a reverse-swinging from Umar Gul, umpires Darrell Hair and Billy Doctrove called a halt to play as they adjudged Pakistan to be guilty of ball tampering. The ball was replaced and England was awarded 5 penalty runs. This event was the catalyst for the subsequent refusal to continue the match after tea by the Pakistan team. Based on the Laws of Cricket, the umpires declared Pakistan to have forfeited the game. The ICC later changed the result of the match to a draw, and subsequently reinstated the original result on 1 February 2009.

2010 spot-fixing scandal

The Pakistan cricket team toured England from 29 July to 22 September 2010. The tour consisted of four Tests, two T20Is and five ODIs. During the Test series, Pakistan lost the first two Test by 354 runs and 9 wickets. They came back to win the third Test by 4 wickets. However, in the fourth Test, the spot-fixing took place. On the third day of the 4th Test, British newspaper News of the World published a story with allegations that an agent loosely affiliated with some of the Pakistani players (later identified as Mazhar Majeed) had accepted a £150,000 (US$232,665) bribe from undercover reporters for information that two Pakistani bowlers (Mohammad Asif and Mohammad Amir) would deliberately deliver no balls at specific points during the match. The third player was also caught. It was Pakistan's Test skipper Salman Butt, who was revealed to be the master mind of this case. On 1 November 2011, Asif, Amir, and Butt were found guilty for their part in the spot-fixing and were given prison sentences, ranging from six months to 30 months and now Amir played well.

Under Misbah-ul-Haq

After Amir, Asif and Butt were dismissed, Pakistan made Misbah ul Haq the new captain of Pakistan. In subsequent series against South Africa in the UAE he led Pakistan in tests. After resignation of Shahid Afridi as test captain and suspension of Salman Butt due to spot-fixing scandal, Misbah was preferred over Younus Khan, Mohammad Yousuf and Kamran Akmal as captain. Wasim Akram stated that although the decision was surprising, if Misbah bats and fields well everything else will go according to plan.

Former Pakistan coach Geoff Lawson stated that he believed Misbah has the best cricketing brain within Pakistan and he will do incredibly well in the plans for the captaincy Misbah hit back at those who criticised the decision to appoint him captain and stated that he should be given a chance to prove himself.

In Misbah's first series against South Africa in UAE 2010, he led the two match Test series to draw 0-0. Later the team toured New Zealand where they won two match Test series 1–0. Pakistan also went to West Indies and Zimbabwe for two Match and lone Test match. They drew 1-1 and won 1–0 over West Indies and Zimbabwe respectively.
They also won against the touring Sri Lankan team, winning 1-0 (3) and whitewashed Bangladesh 2-0 (2).

One of the most biggest moment for Pakistan under Misbah's captaincy was when they whitewashed England, the then no.1 side, who toured UAE in early 2012. Mohsin Khan, the Pakistan coach, compared his team's whitewash against England to the 1992 Cricket World Cup triumph. "Today is like a dream come true," Mohsin told Sky Sports. "It's not a very experienced team but it's very talented. Today, the captain and all the players have proved they are one of the best in the world. It's a great achievement for the Pakistan team."

Against the South Africa cricket team in 2013 tour, they were badly whitewashed by the Proteas by 3-0 (3). In first Test, they were bowled out for 49, the worst in their history. That was considered to be worst performance against top side. At the same year, they also got their second defeat to Zimbabwe when Pakistan toured for two match Test series. The series was drawn 1-1. In early 2014, against Sri Lanka who toured UAE for 3 match series, Pakistan were down 1-0 after two match. In the final match, the first four days went nowhere until the early fifth day when Pakistan managed to bowl out the Sri Lankan cricket team for 214 and were asked to chase 301 in last two and a half session. Pakistan chased it down in 57.3 overs, the fastest chase in Test cricket history.

Another greatest performance from Pakistan is when they whitewashed the touring Australian cricket team. After beating Pakistan 1–0 in T20Is and 3–0 in ODIs, Pakistan were doubtful to win a two match Test series against the tourist.  However, Pakistan won the matches by 221 runs and 356 runs. The win in the second Test was their highest winning margin against any opposition in their history. Also in the same match, Misbah equaled the then fastest Test match century off 56 deliveries.

Against New Zealand, who toured Pakistan for 3 Test match series. After winning the first Test, Misbah became Pakistan's most successful Test captain win 15 wins, taking over Imran Khan and Javed Miandad's joint 14 win record. The series went to draw 1-1 (3).

Another moment for Pakistan under Misbah was when Pakistan toured Sri Lanka and defeated them in three match Test series. There, it was the first time Pakistan defeat Sri Lanka in Sri Lanka after 9 years. And when England toured UAE for three match Test series, Pakistan defeated them 2-0 (3). As a result, they climbed to No.2 in Test rankings, also after 9 years.

Rise to No.1 in Tests

In 2016, Pakistan became No.1 Test team after their tour of England, where they drew series 2-2 (4). It was the first time since the ranking system were introduced, they were crowned No.1 and first time since 1988. It was another great achievement in Pakistan's Test history. They were also given Test mace in Lahore. However, their No.1 rank was short-lived, as their downfall began. After winning the series against the West Indies 2-1 (3) in UAE, Pakistan toured New Zealand and Australia for two match and three match Test series. They lost all five matches plus one lost against West Indies. They were down at No.5 in rankings. Misbah was considering retirement after the Australia tour but stayed till West Indies tour, saying he had 'one last job to do'.

Despite having major upsets in the southern continent, Pakistan were triumphant in the West Indies tour of 2017, having won the T20 series 3–1, the ODI series by 2–1, and winning a thriller in the 3rd test to seal it 2–1. This was Pakistan's first ever test series win in the Caribbean. Misbah-ul-Haq and Younus Khan retired after, with the captaincy going to Sarfaraz Ahmed.

Governing body

The Pakistan Cricket Board (PCB) is responsible for all first class and Test cricket played in Pakistan and by the Pakistan cricket team. It was admitted to the International Cricket Council in July 1953. The corporation has been run by former cricketers, professional administrators and trustees, who are often respected businessmen. The Board governs a network of teams sponsored by corporations and banks, city associations and clubs including advertising, broadcasting rights and internet partners.

The PCB's experiment with the Twenty20 cricket model has also proven popular and hopes to similarly revive popular interest in domestic games, which it did. The PCB also set up major domestic competitions such as the Quaid-i-Azam Trophy, the Faysal Bank T20 Cup, the Pakistan Super League and the National Twenty20 Cup.

Sponsorship 
The current sponsors are:

Tournament history
A red box around the year indicates tournaments played within Pakistan

ICC World Test Championship

ICC Cricket World Cup

ICC T20 World Cup

ICC Champions Trophy
Known as the ’ICC Knockout’ in 1998 and 2000

ACC Asia Cup

Other tournaments

Honours

ICC
World Cup:
 Champions (1): 1992
 Runners-up (1): 1999
T20 World Cup:
 Champions (1): 2009
 Runners-up (2): 2007, 2022
Champions Trophy:
 Champions (1): 2017

ACC
Asia Cup:
 Champions (2): 2000, 2012
 Runners-up (3): 1986, 2014, 2022
Asian Test Championship:
 Champions (1): 1998–99
 Runners-up (1): 2001–02

Others
Asian Games
 Bronze Medal (1): 2010
South Asian Games
 Bronze Medal (1): 2010

List of International grounds

Correct as of New Zealand cricket team in Pakistan in 2022–23 (December 2022)

Pakistan women's cricket team

The Pakistan women's cricket team has a much lower profile than the men's team. For all national women's cricket teams, the female players are paid much less their male counterparts and the women's teams do not receive as much popular support or recognition as the men's team. The women's teams also have a less packed schedule compared to men's teams and play fewer matches. The team played it first match during 1997, when it was on tour of New Zealand and Australia and were invited to the World Cup later that year and in the Women's Asia Cup during 2005 the team came third place. During 2007, the team with face South Africa and later in the year travel to Ireland to play in the Women's World Cup Qualifier. The team also played at the T20 England World Cup, the team finished 6th place, beating Sri Lanka and South Africa in 2009.

Team colours
In Test matches, the team wears cricket whites, with an optional sweater or sweater-vest with a green and gold V-neck for use in cold weather. The team's official sponsors have been Pepsi & Junaid Jamshed since 1993 with their logo displayed on the right side of the chest, sister brand Lay's on the sleeves, and the Pakistan Cricket star deployed on the left in test cricket. The fielders wear a green cap or a white (or green in ODI and T20 matches) sunhats, with the Pakistan Cricket Star in the middle. Also the helmets are colored green. Boom Boom Cricket signed a deal with Pakistan Cricket Board in April 2010 to become the kit sponsors of the Pakistan team; the deal ended at the end of 2012 Asia Cup.
Currently, as of 2019, Pakistan is sponsored by AJ Sports, replacing CA Sports, which was the sponsor between 2015 and 2019.
Pakistan's One Day and Twenty 20 kits vary from year to year with the team wearing its green color in various shades from kit to kit. Historically, Pakistan's kits have had shades of blue, yellow and golden in addition to green.
For official ICC tournaments, 'Pakistan' is written on the front of the jersey in place of the sponsor logo, with the sponsor logo being placed on the sleeve. However, for non-ICC tournaments and matches, the 'Pepsi' logo feature prominently on the front of the shirt . As always the Pakistan Cricket Board logo is placed on the left chest.

Former suppliers were CA Sports (2015-2019), Hunt, Slazenger and AJ Sports.

Logo
During the early years, Pakistan cricket team's logo was a shaheen with star and crescent on it but this crest changed in 1959. Pakistan's cricket team's current logo is a star, usually in the color gold or green, with the word "Pakistan" (پاکِستان) written inside in Urdu, Pakistan's national language.

Captains

Current squad
On 30 June 2022, The PCB published new central contracts for the Pakistan Cricket team for the 2022–2023 season. Central contracts were awarded to 26 players in four different categories (red ball and/or white ball), along with 7 players being named in emerging category. 

This is a list of active players who are centrally contracted with PCB or has played for Pakistan in the past 12 months or has been named in the recent Test, ODI or T20I squad. Uncapped players are listed in italics.

Azhar Ali played Test cricket for Pakistan in the past 12 months, but has announced retirement from International cricket. Updated on 25 January 2023.

Note - Haseebullah Khan, Mohammad Huraira, Ali Usman and Qasim Akram were also awarded Emerging category contracts.

Coaching and managing staff

''Correct as of 15 March 2023

Coaching history
Pakistan has been known for its high turnover of head coaches. In 2014 it was reported that Pakistan had changed head coach 27 times since 1992, with a number of coaches sacked midway through tournaments or series and several coaches serving multiple stints.
1995:  Intikhab Alam
1996:  Mushtaq Mohammad
1996–1998:  Haroon Rasheed
1998–1999:  Javed Miandad
1999:  Mushtaq Mohammad
1999:  Wasim Raja (interim)
1999:  Richard Pybus (interim)
1999–2000:  Intikhab Alam
2000–2001:  Javed Miandad
2001:  Richard Pybus
2001–2002:  Mudassar Nazar
2002–2003:  Richard Pybus
2003–2004:  Javed Miandad
2004–2007:  Bob Woolmer
2007–2008:  Geoff Lawson
2008–2010:  Intikhab Alam
2010–2011:  Waqar Younis
2011–2012:  Mohsin Khan (interim)
2012–2014:  Dav Whatmore
2014:  Moin Khan (interim)
2014–2016:  Waqar Younis
2016–2019:  Mickey Arthur
2019–2021:  Misbah-ul-Haq
2021–2023:  Saqlain Mushtaq
2023:  Abdul Rehman (interim)

Selection committee
In January 2023, Haroon Rasheed was appointed as chief selector by the PCB with Kamran Akmal, Yasir Hameed and Mohammad Sami appointed as members of the selection committee.

Records

Results summary
International match summary

Test record versus other nations

ODI record versus other nations

T20I record versus other nations

Batting

Test batting records

One-Day International batting records

T20 International batting records

Bowling

Test bowling records

One-Day International bowling records

T20 International records

Miscellaneous records

See also

 Cricket in Pakistan
 India–Pakistan cricket rivalry
 Benaud–Qadir Trophy
 Afghanistan–Pakistan cricket rivalry
 Pakistan blind cricket team
 Pakistan cricket team records
 Pakistan national women's cricket team
 Pakistan U-19 cricket team
 Pakistan Super League
 Pakistani national cricket captains
 Politics and sports
 List of Pakistan Test cricketers
 List of Pakistan ODI cricketers
 List of Pakistan Twenty20 International cricketers

References

Further reading

External links

 
 ESPN Cricinfo Pakistan

Cricket in Pakistan
National cricket teams
Cricket
Laureus World Sports Awards winners
Cricket